Lynncote is a historic estate located near Tryon, Polk County, North Carolina.  It was designed by architect Erle G. Stillwell and built in 1927–1928.  It is a two-story, eight bay, Tudor Revival style stone dwelling built on the foundation of a previous dwelling built in 1895 and burned in 1916.  It features an off-center entrance pavilion, leaded-glass casement windows, and half-timbering.  Other contributing resources are the estate landscape, workshop (c. 1910, c. 1928), and Lynncote Lodge (1925-1926).

It was added to the National Register of Historic Places in 2010.

References

Houses on the National Register of Historic Places in North Carolina
Tudor Revival architecture in North Carolina
Houses completed in 1928
Houses in Polk County, North Carolina
National Register of Historic Places in Polk County, North Carolina